The 2014 Milwaukee Brewers season was the 45th season for the Brewers in Milwaukee, the 17th in the National League, and 46th overall. After leading the National League Central division for much of the season, the Brewers collapsed in the second half and missed the playoffs. They finished 82–80, finishing in third place.

Regular season

Season standings

National League Central

National League Wild Card

Record vs. opponents

Game log

|-  style="text-align:center; bgcolor="#bbffbb"
|- style="background:#" bgcolor="#bbffbb"
| 1 || March 31 || Braves || 2–0 || Gallardo (1–0) || Teherán (0–1) || Rodríguez (1) || 45,691 || 1–0
|- style="background:#" bgcolor="#ffbbbb"
| 2 || April 1 || Braves || 2–5 || Wood (1–0) || Lohse (0–1) || Kimbrel (1) || 21,503 || 1–1
|- style="background:#" bgcolor="#ffbbbb"
| 3 || April 2 || Braves || 0–1 || Harang (1–0) || Garza (0–1) || Kimbrel (2) || 21,712 || 1–2
|- style="background:#" bgcolor="#bbffbb"
| 4 || April 4 || @ Red Sox || 6–2 || Kintzler (1–0) || Mujica (0–1) ||  || 36,728 || 2–2
|- style="background:#" bgcolor="#bbffbb"
| 5 || April 5 || @ Red Sox || 7–6 (11) || Thornburg (1–0) || Badenhop (0–1) || Rodríguez (2) || 35,729 || 3–2
|- style="background:#" bgcolor="#bbffbb"
| 6 || April 6 || @ Red Sox || 4–0 || Gallardo (2–0) || Lester (0–2) ||  || 35,958 || 4–2
|- style="background:#" bgcolor="bbbbbb"
| – || April 7 || @ Phillies || 2:05pm ||colspan=6| PPD, RAIN; rescheduled for April 8 
|- style="background:#" bgcolor="#bbffbb"
| 7 || April 8 || @ Phillies || 10–4 || Lohse (1–1) || Kendrick (0–1) ||  || 45,061 || 5–2
|- style="background:#" bgcolor="#bbffbb"
| 8 || April 9 || @ Phillies || 9–4 || Thornburg (2–0) || Bastardo (0–1) ||  || 31,168 || 6–2
|- style="background:#" bgcolor="#bbffbb"
| 9 || April 10 || @ Phillies || 6–2 || Estrada (1–0) || Lee (2–1) ||  || 25,492 || 7–2
|- style="background:#" bgcolor="#bbffbb"
| 10 || April 11 || Pirates || 4–2 || Peralta (1–0) || Liriano (0–2) || Rodríguez (3) || 27,469 || 8–2
|- style="background:#" bgcolor="#bbffbb"
| 11 || April 12 || Pirates || 3–2 || Henderson (1–0) || Melancon (0–1) || Rodríguez (4) || 42,828 || 9–2
|- style="background:#" bgcolor="#bbffbb"
| 12 || April 13 || Pirates || 4–1 || Lohse (2–1) || Morton (0–1) || Smith (1) || 32,152 || 10-2
|- style="background:#" bgcolor="#ffbbbb"
| 13 || April 14 || Cardinals || 0–4 || Lynn (3–0) || Garza (0–2) ||  || 27,090 || 10–3
|- style="background:#" bgcolor="#ffbbbb"
| 14 || April 15 || Cardinals || 1–6 || Miller (1–2) || Estrada (1–1) ||  || 27,470 || 10–4
|- style="background:#" bgcolor="#bbffbb"
| 15 || April 16 || Cardinals || 5–1 || Peralta (2–0) || Kelly (1–1) ||  || 26,668 || 11–4
|- style="background:#" bgcolor="#ffbbbb"
| 16 || April 17 || @ Pirates || 2–11 || Vólquez (1–0) || Wooten (0–1) ||  || 17,584 || 11–5
|- style="background:#" bgcolor="#bbffbb"
| 17 || April 18 || @ Pirates || 5–3 || Lohse (3–1) || Morton (0–2) || Rodríguez (5) || 31,564 || 12–5
|- style="background:#" bgcolor="#bbffbb"
| 18 || April 19 || @ Pirates || 8–7 || Henderson (2–0) || Grilli (0–1) || Rodríguez (6) || 32,490 || 13–5
|- style="background:#" bgcolor="#bbffbb"
| 19 || April 20 || @ Pirates || 3–2 (14) || Duke (1–0) || Gómez (0–1)  || Rodríguez (7) || 21,761 || 14–5
|- style="background:#" bgcolor="#bbffbb"
| 20 || April 21 || Padres || 4–3 || Peralta (3–0) || Cashner (2–2) || Rodríguez (8) || 25,408 || 15–5
|- style="background:#" bgcolor="#ffbbbb"
| 21 || April 22 || Padres || 1–2 (12) || Roach (1–0) || Fígaro (0–1) || Street (7) || 25,815 || 15–6
|- style="background:#" bgcolor="#bbffbb"
| 22 || April 23 || Padres || 5–2 || Lohse (2–3) || Ross (4–1) || Rodríguez (9) || 28,095 || 16–6
|- style="background:#" bgcolor="#bbffbb"
| 23 || April 25 || Cubs || 5–2 || Garza (1–2) || Villanueva (1–5) || Rodríguez (10) || 32,868 || 17–6
|- style="background:#" bgcolor="#bbffbb"
| 24 || April 26 || Cubs || 5–3 || Estrada (2–1) || Wood (1–3) || Rodríguez (11) || 40,008 || 18–6
|- style="background:#" bgcolor="#ffbbbb"
| 25 || April 27 || Cubs || 0–4 || Hammel (4–1) || Peralta (3–1) ||  || 45,286 || 18–7
|- style="background:#" bgcolor="#bbffbb"
| 26 || April 28 || @ Cardinals || 5–3 (12) || Duke (2–0) || Maness (0–2) || Rodríguez (12) || 40,514 || 19–7
|- style="background:#" bgcolor="#bbffbb"
| 27 || April 29 || @ Cardinals || 5–4 (11) || Thornburg (3–0) || Siegrist (0–1) || Rodríguez (13) || 40,531 || 20–7
|- style="background:#" bgcolor="#ffbbbb"
| 28 || April 30 || @ Cardinals || 3–9 || Miller (3–2) || Garza (1–3) ||  || 40,783 || 20–8

|- style="background:#" bgcolor="#ffbbbb"
| 29 || May 1 || @ Reds || 3–8 || Bailey (2–2) || Henderson (2–1) ||  || 16,779 || 20–9
|- style="background:#" bgcolor="#bbffbb"
| 30 || May 2 || @ Reds || 2–0 || Peralta (4–1) || Leake (2–3) || Rodríguez (14) || 32,759 || 21–9
|- style="background:#" bgcolor="#ffbbbb"
| 31 || May 3 || @ Reds || 2–6 || Cueto (3–2) || Gallardo (2–1) ||  || 38,243 || 21–10
|- style="background:#" bgcolor="#ffbbbb"
| 32 || May 4 || @ Reds || 3–4 (10) || LeCure (1–1) || Thornburg (3–1) ||  || 32,953 || 21–11
|- style="background:#" bgcolor="#bbffbb"
| 33 || May 5 || Diamondbacks || 8–3 || Garza (2–3) || Bolsinger (1–2) ||  || 27,220 || 22–11
|- style="background:#" bgcolor="#ffbbbb"
| 34 || May 6 || Diamondbacks || 5–7 || Marshall (1–0) || Kintzler (1–1) || Reed (9) || 27,497 || 22–12
|- style="background:#" bgcolor="#ffbbbb"
| 35 || May 7 || Diamondbacks || 2–3 || Arroyo (3–2) || Peralta (4–2) || Reed (10) || 24,013 || 22–13
|- style="background:#" bgcolor="#ffbbbb"
| 36 || May 9 || Yankees || 3–5 || Tanaka (5–0) || Gallardo (2–2) || Robertson (6) || 40,123 || 22–14
|- style="background:#" bgcolor="#bbffbb"
| 37 || May 10 || Yankees || 5–4 || Duke (3–0) || Aceves (0–1) || Rodríguez (15) || 43,085 || 23–14
|- style="background:#" bgcolor="#bbffbb"
| 38 || May 11 || Yankees || 6–5 || Rodríguez (1–0) || Warren (1–2) ||  || 43,544 || 24–14
|- style="background:#" bgcolor="#bbffbb"
| 39 || May 13 || Pirates || 5–2 || Estrada (3–1) || Cole (3–3) || Rodríguez (16) || 24,176 || 25–14
|- style="background:#" bgcolor="#ffbbbb"
| 40 || May 14 || Pirates || 1–4 || Watson (4–0) || Rodríguez (1–1) || Melancon (5) || 24,962 || 25–15
|- style="background:#" bgcolor="#bbffbb"
| 41 || May 15 || Pirates || 4–3 || Wooten (1–1) || Melancon (1–2) ||  || 34,743 || 26–15
|- style="background:#" bgcolor="#bbffbb"
| 42 || May 16 || @ Cubs || 4–3 || Lohse (5–1) || Samardzija (0–4) || Rodríguez (17) || 35,771 || 27–15
|- style="background:#" bgcolor="#ffbbbb"
| 43 || May 17 || @ Cubs || 0–3 || Jackson (3–3) || Garza (2–4) || Rondón (4) || 36,671 || 27–16
|- style="background:#" bgcolor="#ffbbbb"
| 44 || May 18 || @ Cubs || 2–4 || Wood (4–4) || Estrada (3–2) || Rondón (5) || 37,631 || 27–17
|- style="background:#" bgcolor="#ffbbbb"
| 45 || May 19 || @ Braves || 3–9 || Minor (2–2) || Peralta (4–3) ||  || 20,468 || 27–18
|- style="background:#" bgcolor="#ffbbbb"
| 46 || May 20 || @ Braves || 0–5 || Teherán (3–3) || Gallardo (2–3) ||  || 20,045 || 27–19
|- style="background:#" bgcolor="#bbffbb"
| 47 || May 21 || @ Braves || 6–1 || Lohse (6–1) || Santana (4–2) ||  || 18,148 || 28–19 
|- style="background:#" bgcolor="#ffbbbb"
| 48 || May 22 || @ Braves || 4–5 || Wood (4–5) || Kintzler (1–2) || Kimbrel (12) || 30,148 || 28–20
|- style="background:#" bgcolor="#bbffbb"
| 49 || May 23 || @ Marlins || 9–5 || Estrada (4–2) || Koehler (4–4) ||  || 18,989 || 29–20
|- style="background:#" bgcolor="#ffbbbb"
| 50 || May 24 || @ Marlins || 1–2 || Turner (1–2) || Peralta (4–4) || Cishek (10) || 25,819 || 29–21
|- style="background:#" bgcolor="#bbffbb"
| 51 || May 25 || @ Marlins || 7–1 || Nelson (1–0) || Wolf (0–1) ||  || 21,897 || 30–21
|- style="background:#" bgcolor="#ffbbbb"
| 52 || May 26 || Orioles || 6–7 (10) || O'Day (2–0) || Wooten (1–2) || Britton (3) || 42,889 || 30–22
|- style="background:#" bgcolor="#bbffbb"
| 53 || May 27 || Orioles || 7–6 (10) || Rodríguez (2–1) || McFarland (0–1) ||  || 25,552 || 31–22
|- style="background:#" bgcolor="#bbffbb"
| 54 || May 28 || Orioles || 8–3 || Gallardo (3–3) || Norris (3–5) ||  || 28,280 || 32–22
|- style="background:#" bgcolor="#bbffbb"
| 55 || May 30 || Cubs || 11–5 || Estrada (5–2) || Wood (5–5) ||  || 36,100 || 33–22
|- style="background:#" bgcolor="#ffbbbb"
| 56 || May 31 || Cubs || 0–8 || Hammel (6–3) || Peralta (4–5) ||  || 42,332 || 33–23

|- style="background:#" bgcolor="#bbffbb"
| 57 || June 1 || Cubs || 9–0 || Lohse (7–1) || Samardzija (1–5) ||  || 36,277 || 34–23
|- style="background:#" bgcolor="#bbffbb"
| 58 || June 2 || Twins || 6–2 || Garza (3–4) || Gibson (4–5) ||  || 28,708 || 35–23
|- style="background:#" bgcolor="#ffbbbb"
| 59 || June 3 || Twins || 4–6 || Deduno (2–3) || Gallardo (3–4) || Perkins (15) || 25,634 || 35–24
|- style="background:#" bgcolor="#ffbbbb"
| 60 || June 4 || @ Twins || 4–6 || Nolasco (4–5) || Wooten (1–3) || Perkins (16) || 31,144 || 35–25
|- style="background:#" bgcolor="#bbffbb"
| 61 || June 5 || @ Twins || 8–5 || Peralta (5–5) || Correia (2–7) || Rodríguez (18) || 35,110 || 36–25
|- style="background:#" bgcolor="#ffbbbb"
| 62 || June 6 || @ Pirates || 5–15 || Cumpton (1–2) || Lohse (7–2) ||  || 35,544 || 36–26
|- style="background:#" bgcolor="#bbffbb"
| 63 || June 7 || @ Pirates || 9–3 || Garza (4–4) || Vólquez (3–5) ||  || 38,525 || 37–26
|- style="background:#" bgcolor="#bbffbb"
| 64 || June 8 || @ Pirates || 1–0 || Gallardo (4–4) || Locke (0–1) || Rodríguez (19) || 35,002 || 38–26
|- style="background:#" bgcolor="#ffbbbb"
| 65 || June 10 || @ Mets || 2–6 || Matsuzaka (3–0) || Estrada (5–3) ||  || 20,206 || 38–27
|- style="background:#" bgcolor="#bbffbb"
| 66 || June 11 || @ Mets || 3–1 || Peralta (6–5) || deGrom (0–3) || Rodríguez (20) || 20,170 || 39–27
|- style="background:#" bgcolor="#bbffbb"
| 67 || June 12 || @ Mets || 5–1 (13) || Duke (4–0) || Torres (2–4) ||  || 22,155 || 40–27
|- style="background:#" bgcolor="#ffbbbb"
| 68 || June 13 || Reds || 5–6 || Broxton (2–0) || Rodríguez (2–2) || Chapman (11) || 38,330 || 40–28
|- style="background:#" bgcolor="#bbffbb"
| 69 || June 14 || Reds || 4–2 || Smith (1–0) || Hoover (1–5) || Rodríguez (21) || 40,507 || 41–28
|- style="background:#" bgcolor="#ffbbbb"
| 70 || June 15 || Reds || 4–13 || Leake (4–6) || Estrada (5–4) ||  || 42,213 || 41–29
|- style="background:#" bgcolor="#bbffbb"
| 71 || June 16 || @ Diamondbacks || 9–3 || Peralta (7–5) || Harris (0–2) ||  || 18,262 || 42–29
|- style="background:#" bgcolor="#bbffbb"
| 72 || June 17 || @ Diamondbacks || 7–5 || Lohse (8–2) || Marshall (2–2) || Rodríguez (22) || 18,148 || 43–29
|- style="background:#" bgcolor="#ffbbbb"
| 73 || June 18 || @ Diamondbacks || 3–4 || Ziegler (3–1) || Kintzler (1–3) ||  || 19,711 || 43–30
|- style="background:#" bgcolor="#bbffbb"
| 74 || June 19 || @ Diamondbacks || 4–1 || Gallardo (5–4) || Anderson (5–2) || Rodríguez (23) || 22,559 || 44–30
|- style="background:#" bgcolor="#bbffbb"
| 75 || June 20 || @ Rockies || 13–10 || Estrada (6–4) || Bergman (0–2) || Rodríguez (24) || 41,238 || 45–30
|- style="background:#" bgcolor="#bbffbb"
| 76 || June 21 || @ Rockies || 9–4 || Peralta (8–5) || Friedrich (0–1) ||  || 38,020 || 46–30
|- style="background:#" bgcolor="#bbffbb"
| 77 || June 22 || @ Rockies || 6–5 || Lohse (9–2) || Matzek (1–2) || Rodríguez (25) || 36,619 || 47–30
|- style="background:#" bgcolor="#ffbbbb"
| 78 || June 23 || Nationals || 0–3 || Gonzalez (4–4) || Garza (4–5) || Clippard (1) || 31,102 || 47–31
|- style="background:#" bgcolor="#ffbbbb"
| 79 || June 24 || Nationals || 2–4 (16) || Clippard (5–2) || Fiers (0–1) || Soriano (18) || 30,149 || 47–32
|- style="background:#" bgcolor="#bbffbb"
| 80 || June 25 || Nationals || 9–2 || Estrada (7–4) || Strasburg (6–6) ||  || 39,049 || 48–32
|- style="background:#" bgcolor="#bbffbb"
| 81 || June 26 || Rockies || 7–4 || Peralta (9–5) || Friedrich (0–2) || Rodríguez (26) || 27,056 || 49–32
|- style="background:#" bgcolor="#bbffbb"
| 82 || June 27 || Rockies || 3–2 || Rodríguez (3–2) || Belisle (2–3) ||  || 34,132 || 50–32
|- style="background:#" bgcolor="#bbffbb"
| 83 || June 28 || Rockies || 7–4 || Garza (5–5) || Chacín (1–7) || Rodríguez (27) || 40,816 || 51–32
|- style="background:#" bgcolor="#ffbbbb"
| 84 || June 29 || Rockies || 4–10 || de la Rosa (8–6) || Gallardo (5–5) ||  || 43,656 || 51–33

|- style="background:#" bgcolor="#ffbbbb"
| 85 || July 1 || @ Blue Jays || 1–4 || Hutchison (6–6) || Estrada (7–5) || Janssen (13) || 45,088 || 51–34
|- style="background:#" bgcolor="#ffbbbb"
| 86 || July 2 || @ Blue Jays || 4–7 || Janssen (3–0) || Smith (1–1) ||  || 24,286 || 51–35
|- style="background:#" bgcolor="#ffbbbb"
| 87 || July 4 || @ Reds || 2–4 || Simón (11–3) || Lohse (9–3) || Chapman (17) || 42,120 || 51–36
|- style="background:#" bgcolor="#bbffbb"
| 88 || July 5 || @ Reds || 1–0 || Garza (6–5) || Bailey (8–5) ||  || 38,754 || 52–36
|- style="background:#" bgcolor="#ffbbbb"
| 89 || July 6 || @ Reds || 2–4 || Latos (2–1) || Smith (1–2) || Broxton (6) || 27,923 || 52–37
|- style="background:#" bgcolor="#ffbbbb"
| 90 || July 7 || Phillies || 2–3 || Hamels (3–5) || Estrada (7–6) || Papelbon (20) || 28,080 || 52–38
|- style="background:#" bgcolor="#ffbbbb"
| 91 || July 8 || Phillies || 7–9 || Kendrick (4–8) || Peralta (9–6) || Papelbon (21) || 26,126 || 52–39
|- style="background:#" bgcolor="#ffbbbb"
| 92 || July 9 || Phillies || 1–4 || Hernández (4–8) || Lohse (9–4) || Papelbon (22) || 26,480 || 52–40
|- style="background:#" bgcolor="#ffbbbb"
| 93 || July 10 || Phillies || 1–9 || Buchanan (5–5) || Garza (6–6) ||  || 36,394 || 52–41
|- style="background:#" bgcolor="#ffbbbb"
| 94 || July 11 || Cardinals || 6–7 || Neshek (4–0) || Rodríguez (3–3) || Rosenthal (28) || 35,501 || 52–42
|- style="background:#" bgcolor="#ffbbbb"
| 95 || July 12 || Cardinals || 2–10 || Wainwright (12–4) || Nelson (1–1) ||  || 40,198 || 52–43
|- style="background:#" bgcolor="#bbffbb"
| 96 || July 13 || Cardinals || 11–2 || Peralta (10–6) || Martinez (2–4) ||  || 35,345 || 53–43
|- style="background:#" bgcolor="#bbffbb"
| 97 || July 18 || @ Nationals || 4–2 || Lohse (10–4) || Strasburg (7–7) || Rodríguez (28) || 39,373 || 54–43
|- style="background:#" bgcolor="#ffbbbb"
| 98 || July 19 || @ Nationals || 3–8 || Roark (9–6) || Garza (6–7) || || 38,649 || 54–44
|- style="background:#" bgcolor="#ffbbbb"
| 99 || July 20 || @ Nationals || 4–5 || Soriano (2–0) || Wooten (1–4) || || 36,373 || 54–45
|- style="background:#" bgcolor="#bbffbb"
| 100 || July 21 || Reds || 5–2 || Peralta (11–6) || Latos (2–2) || Rodríguez (29) || 31,350 || 55–45
|- style="background:#" bgcolor="#bbffbb"
| 101 || July 22 || Reds || 4–3 || Rodríguez (4–3) || LeCure (1–2) ||  || 33,485 || 56–45
|- style="background:#" bgcolor="#bbffbb"
| 102 || July 23 || Reds || 5–1 || Lohse (11–4) || Leake (7–9) ||  || 38,192 || 57–45
|- style="background:#" bgcolor="#bbffbb"
| 103 || July 24 || Mets || 9–1 || Garza (7–7) || Gee (4–3) ||  || 29,755 || 58–45
|- style="background:#" bgcolor="#ffbbbb"
| 104 || July 25 || Mets || 2–3 || Torres (5–4) || Rodríguez (4–4) || Mejía (14) || 33,097 || 58–46
|- style="background:#" bgcolor="#bbffbb"
| 105 || July 26 || Mets || 5–2 || Peralta (12–6) || Niese (5–6) || Rodríguez (30) || 39,292 || 59–46
|- style="background:#" bgcolor="#ffbbbb"
| 106 || July 27 || Mets || 0–2 || deGrom (5–5) || Nelson (1–2) || Mejía (15) || 39,040 || 59–47
|- style="background:#" bgcolor="#ffbbbb"
| 107 || July 28 || @ Rays || 1–2 || Odorizzi (7–8) || Lohse (11–5) || McGee (12) || 12,660 || 59–48
|- style="background:#" bgcolor="#ffbbbb"
| 108 || July 29 || @ Rays || 1–5 || Cobb (7–6) || Smith (1–3) ||  || 16,249 || 59–49
|- style="background:#" bgcolor="#bbffbb"
| 109 || July 30 || @ Rays || 5–0 || Gallardo (6–5) || Price (11–8) || Rodríguez (31) || 24,809 || 60–49

|- style="background:#" bgcolor="#bbffbb"
| 110 || August 1 || @ Cardinals || 7–4 || Peralta (13–6) || Wainwright (13–6) || Rodríguez (32) || 45,306 || 61–49
|- style="background:#" bgcolor="#ffbbbb"
| 111 || August 2 || @ Cardinals || 7–9 || Masterson (5–6) || Lohse (11–6) || Rosenthal (33) || 45,719 || 61–50
|- style="background:#" bgcolor="#ffbbbb"
| 112 || August 3 || @ Cardinals || 2–3 || Lackey (12–7) || Jeffress (0–1) || Rosenthal (34) || 44,662 || 61–51
|- style="background:#" bgcolor="#bbffbb"
| 113 || August 5 || Giants || 4–3 || Nelson (2–2) || Machi (6–1) || Rodríguez (33) || 40,465 || 62–51
|- style="background:#" bgcolor="#ffbbbb"
| 114 || August 6 || Giants || 4–7 || Vogelsong (7–8) || Gallardo (6–6) ||  || 33,394 || 62–52
|- style="background:#" bgcolor="#bbffbb"
| 115 || August 7 || Giants || 3–1 || Peralta (14–6) || Peavy (1–12) || Rodríguez (34) || 38,229 || 63–52
|- style="background:#" bgcolor="#bbffbb"
| 116 || August 8 || Dodgers || 9–3 || Jeffress (1–1) || League (2–3) ||  || 37,434 || 64–52
|- style="background:#" bgcolor="#bbffbb"
| 117 || August 9 || Dodgers || 4–1 || Fiers (1–1) || Greinke (12–8) || Rodríguez (35) || 40,553 || 65–52
|- style="background:#" bgcolor="#ffbbbb"
| 118 || August 10 || Dodgers || 1–5 || Kershaw (14–2) || Nelson (2–3) ||  || 43,612 || 65–53
|- style="background:#" bgcolor="#bbffbb"
| 119 || August 11 || @ Cubs || 3–1 || Gallardo (7–6) || Arrieta (6–4) || Rodríguez (36) || 28,927 || 66–53
|- style="background:#" bgcolor="#ffbbbb"
| 120 || August 12 || @ Cubs || 0–3 || Hendricks (4–1) || Peralta (14–7) || Rondón (15) || 28,819 || 66–54
|- style="background:#" bgcolor="#ffbbbb"
| 121 || August 13 || @ Cubs || 2–4 || Wada (2–1) || Lohse (11–7) || Rondón (16) || 31,191 || 66–55
|- style="background:#" bgcolor="#bbffbb"
| 122 || August 14 || @ Cubs || 6–2 || Fiers (2–1) || Jackson (6–13) ||  || 38,157 || 67–55
|- style="background:#" bgcolor="#bbffbb"
| 123 || August 15 || @ Dodgers || 6–3 || Kintzler (2–3) || Wright (4–3) || Rodríguez (37) || 47,272 || 68–55
|- style="background:#" bgcolor="#bbffbb"
| 124 || August 16 || @ Dodgers || 3–2 || Gallardo (8–6) || Kershaw (14–3) || Rodríguez (38) || 50,849 || 69–55
|- style="background:#" bgcolor="#bbffbb"
| 125 || August 17 || @ Dodgers || 7–2 || Peralta (15–7) || Haren (10–10) ||  || 43,357 || 70–55
|- style="background:#" bgcolor="#bbffbb"
| 126 || August 19 || Blue Jays || 6–1 || Fiers (3–1) || Happ (8–8) ||  || 42,221 || 71–55
|- style="background:#" bgcolor="#ffbbbb"
| 127 || August 20 || Blue Jays || 5–9 || Dickey (10–12) || Nelson (2–4) ||  || 39,300 || 71–56
|- style="background:#" bgcolor="#ffbbbb"
| 128 || August 22 || Pirates || 3–8 || Locke (5–3) || Gallardo (8–7) ||  || 37,437 || 71–57
|- style="background:#" bgcolor="#ffbbbb"
| 129 || August 23 || Pirates || 2–10 || Vólquez (11–7) || Peralta (15–8) ||  || 40,557 || 71–58
|- style="background:#" bgcolor="#bbffbb"
| 130 || August 24 || Pirates || 4–3 || Fiers (4–1) || Worley (5–4) || Rodríguez (39) || 42,761 || 72–58
|- style="background:#" bgcolor="#bbffbb"
| 131 || August 25 || @ Padres || 10–1 || Lohse (12–7) || Stults (6–14) ||  || 24,968 || 73–58
|- style="background:#" bgcolor="#ffbbbb"
| 132 || August 26 || @ Padres || 1–4 || Ross (12–12) || Nelson (2–5) || Benoit (9) || 21,786 || 73–59
|- style="background:#" bgcolor="#ffbbbb"
| 133 || August 27 || @ Padres || 2–3 (10) || Thayer (4–3) || Duke (4–1) ||  || 21,156 || 73–60
|- style="background:#" bgcolor="#ffbbbb"
| 134 || August 29 || @ Giants || 2–13 || Vogelsong (8–9) || Peralta (15–9) ||  || 41,348 || 73–61
|- style="background:#" bgcolor="#ffbbbb"
| 135 || August 30 || @ Giants || 1–3 || Peavy (4–13) || Fiers (4–2) || Casilla (13) || 41,397 || 73–62
|- style="background:#" bgcolor="#ffbbbb"
| 136 || August 31 || @ Giants || 5–15 || Bumgarner (16–9) || Lohse (12–8) ||  || 41,935 || 73–63

|- style="background:#" bgcolor="#ffbbbb"
| 137 || September 1 || @ Cubs || 2–4 || Turner (5–8) || Nelson (2–6) || Rondón (23) || 32,054 || 73–64
|- style="background:#" bgcolor="#ffbbbb"
| 138 || September 2 || @ Cubs || 1–7 || Arrieta (8–5) || Gallardo (8–8) ||  || 28,434 || 73–65
|- style="background:#" bgcolor="#ffbbbb"
| 139 || September 3 || @ Cubs || 2–6 || Hendricks (6–1) || Garza (7–8) ||  || 31,251 || 73–66
|- style="background:#" bgcolor="#ffbbbb"
| 140 || September 4 || Cardinals || 2–3 || Gonzales (2–2) || Peralta (15–10) || Rosenthal (42) || 37,227 || 73–67
|- style="background:#" bgcolor="#bbffbb"
| 141 || September 5 || Cardinals || 6–2 || Fiers (5–2) || Lackey (13–9) ||  || 35,103 || 74–67
|- style="background:#" bgcolor="#ffbbbb"
| 142 || September 6 || Cardinals || 3–5 || Lynn (15–8) || Lohse (12–9) || Rosenthal (43) || 39,042 || 74–68
|- style="background:#" bgcolor="#ffbbbb"
| 143 || September 7 || Cardinals || 1–9 || Wainwright (17–9) || Nelson (2–7) ||  || 31,771 || 74–69
|- style="background:#" bgcolor="#ffbbbb"
| 144 || September 8 || Marlins || 4–6 || Penny (2–1) || Gallardo (8–9) || Cishek (33) || 31,203 || 74–70
|- style="background:#" bgcolor="#ffbbbb"
| 145 || September 9 || Marlins || 3–6 || Morris (8–1) || Rodríguez (4–5) || Cishek (34) || 29,590 || 74–71
|- style="background:#" bgcolor="#bbffbb"
| 146 || September 10 || Marlins || 4–1 || Peralta (16–10) || Cosart (13–9) || Rodríguez (40) || 25,219 || 75–71
|- style="background:#" bgcolor="#bbffbb"
| 147 || September 11 || Marlins || 4–2 || Fiers (6–2) || Eovaldi (6–11) || Rodríguez (41) || 34,028 || 76–71
|- style="background:#" bgcolor="#bbffbb"
| 148 || September 12 || Reds || 3–2 || Rodríguez (5–5) || Díaz (0–1) ||  || 31,463 || 77–71
|- style="background:#" bgcolor="#ffbbbb"
| 149 || September 13 || Reds || 1–5 || Holmberg (1–1) || Gallardo (8–10) ||  || 45,205 || 77–72
|- style="background:#" bgcolor="#bbffbb"
| 150 || September 14 || Reds || 9–2 || Garza (8–8) || Leake (11–12) ||  || 41,870 || 78–72
|- style="background:#" bgcolor="#bbffbb"
| 151 || September 16 || @ Cardinals || 3–2 (12) || Kintzler (3–3) || Siegrist (1–4) || Rodríguez (42) || 44,529 || 79–72
|- style="background:#" bgcolor="#ffbbbb"
| 152 || September 17 || @ Cardinals || 0–2 || Wainwright (19–9) || Fiers (6–3) ||  || 44,480 || 79–73
|- style="background:#" bgcolor="#ffbbbb"
| 153 || September 18 || @ Cardinals || 2–3 (13) || Freeman (2–0) || Nelson (2–8) ||  || 44,823 || 79–74
|- style="background:#" bgcolor="#ffbbbb"
| 154 || September 19 || @ Pirates || 2–4 || Holdzkom (1–0) || Broxton (4–3) || Melancon (31) || 37,974 || 79–75
|- style="background:#" bgcolor="#bbffbb"
| 155 || September 20 || @ Pirates || 1–0 || Duke (5–1) || Melancon (3–5) || Rodríguez (43)  || 39,027 || 80–75
|- style="background:#" bgcolor="#ffbbbb"
| 156 || September 21 || @ Pirates || 0–1 || Worley (8–4) || Peralta (16–11) || Watson (1) || 38,650 || 80–76
|- style="background:#" bgcolor="#ffbbbb"
| 157 || September 23 || @ Reds || 1–3 || Cueto (19–9) || Fiers (6–4) || Chapman (34) || 27,307 || 80–77
|- style="background:#" bgcolor="#bbffbb"
| 158 || September 24 || @ Reds || 5–0 || Lohse (13–9) || Corcino (0–2) ||  || 27,033 || 81–77
|- style="background:#" bgcolor="#ffbbbb"
| 159 || September 25 || @ Reds || 3–5 || Holmberg (2–2) || Gallardo (8–11) || Chapman (35) || 25,824 || 81–78
|- style="background:#" bgcolor="#ffbbbb"
| 160 || September 26 || Cubs || 4–6 || Ramirez (3–3) || Nelson (2–9) || Rondón (28) || 39,880 || 81–79
|- style="background:#" bgcolor="#bbffbb"
| 161 || September 27 || Cubs || 2–1 || Peralta (17–11) || Wada (4–4) || Rodríguez (44) || 41,440 || 82–79
|- style="background:#" bgcolor="#ffbbbb"
| 162 || September 28 || Cubs || 2–5 || Turner (6–11) || Fiers (6–5) || Rondón (29) || 33,837 || 82–80

|

Roster

Detailed Records

Farm system

The Brewers' farm system consisted of seven minor league affiliates in 2014.

References

External links

2014 Milwaukee Brewers season at Baseball Reference
Milwaukee Brewers season Official Site 

Milwaukee Brewers seasons
Milwaukee Brewers
Milwaukee Brew